Thilo Sauter from the Austrian Academy of Sciences, Wiener Neustadt, Austria was named Fellow of the Institute of Electrical and Electronics Engineers (IEEE) in 2014 for contributions to synchronization and security in automation networks.

References

Fellow Members of the IEEE
Living people
Year of birth missing (living people)
Place of birth missing (living people)